Thomas Gerhold (born 21 June 1961) is an American politician. A member of the Republican Party, he was elected to the Iowa House of Representatives for the first time in 2018, from District 75.

Early life, education, and career
Gerhold was born on 21 June 1961. He was raised near Atkins, Iowa, where his family owned a farm. Gerhold attended Benton Community High School, and enrolled at Kirkwood Community College and later the University of Iowa. He then worked as a research associate within the Department of Internal Medicine at the University of Iowa Carver College of Medicine.

Political career
Gerhold  began his campaign in February 2018, ran unopposed in the Republican Party primary, and subsequently won the November 2018 general elections to succeed the retiring Dawn Pettengill of District 75, defeating Democratic Party candidate Paula Denison, and Libertarian Party candidate John George.

References

1961 births
Living people
21st-century American politicians
Republican Party members of the Iowa House of Representatives
People from Benton County, Iowa
Kirkwood Community College alumni
University of Iowa alumni